KKS Karpaty Krosno is a Polish sports club based in Krosno, Poland. The name "Karpaty" refers to the Carpathian mountains.

The football side is currently playing in the IV liga Subcarpathia, the men's volleyball team plays in the II division, whereas the women's team competes in the I division.

History

Football
The club was established in 1928.

The football section has played in the lower divisions of Polish football throughout history. They have never played in the top flight however they had four spells in the 2nd tier: between the 1951–1953 seasons (under the name of Włókniarz Krosno), 1957-1963/1964 (under the names of Legia Krosno, MZKS Krosno and Karpaty Krosno), 1987/1988-1988/1989, and also 1991/1992-1994/1995. The well-known Polish manager Orest Lenczyk coached Karpaty in the early days of his career in 1970–71. Former Stal Mielec legend Marian Kosiński was manager in 1989/90 and 1991/92.

Their biggest success to date is the 1992/93 season where they achieved a 4th place league finish and the 1/16th finals of the Polish Cup, eventually losing to Legia Warsaw 1–3 on 21 October.

Speedway
From 1962 to 1969 speedway was held at the stadium, under the club's name Karpaty Krosno. The team competed in the second division and achieved a best place finish of third in the 1963 Polish speedway season. However, in 1969, due to financial problems, the team's activities were suspended.

Fans 

Despite little success on the field, Karpaty have a small but loyal support, at both volleyball and football matches.

The football fan movement in Krosno started in 1987/1988 when the club was promoted to the 2nd tier. They have friendly contacts with fans of Glinik Gorlice, Unia Tarnów, Nafta Jedlicze, Stal Rzeszów, Hungarian team Zalegeszereg and until 2002, Widzew Łódź[1]. The team currently has from 50 to 250 active supporters per game, but that number can rise up to 600 for important matches.

Their biggest rival is Stal Sanok. The first derby match was played on 26 May 1957 in Krosno in the local III division, under the names of Legia Krosno and Sanoczanka Sanok. Their other fierce rival is Czarni Jasło where tensions frequently flare up between the fans. The club is in close proximity to a number of clubs playing at the same level in the region and therefore contest many local rivalries: Sandecja Nowy Sącz, Wisłoka Dębica, Stal Mielec, JKS Jarosław, Brzozovia Brzozów, Sanovia Lesko and Resovia.

See also 
 Krosno
 Football in Poland
 List of football clubs in Poland

External links 
  Official football team website
  Official volleyball teams' website
  Unofficial football youth team website
  Club's profile on 90minut.pl

References 

Football clubs in Poland
Football clubs in Podkarpackie Voivodeship
Sports clubs established in 1928